Richelot is a surname. Notable people with the surname include:

Friedrich Julius Richelot (1808–1875), German mathematician
Gustave-Antoine Richelot (1806–1893), French physician